Highs in the Mid-Sixties, Volume 3 (subtitled LA '67 / Mondo Hollywood) is a compilation album in the Highs in the Mid-Sixties series, featuring recordings that were released in Los Angeles.  (Despite the subtitle, not all of these records were originally released in 1967. Also, not all the bands are from Los Angeles; The Search and The Lyrics were from San Diego, California).  The subtitle is seemingly taken from Mondo Cane, an influential 1962 documentary film.

Highs in the Mid-Sixties, Volume 1, Highs in the Mid-Sixties, Volume 2, and Highs in the Mid-Sixties, Volume 20 also showcase music from Los Angeles; while two of the later CDs in the Pebbles series, Pebbles, Volume 8 and Pebbles, Volume 9 feature bands from throughout Southern California.

Release data
This album was released in 1983 as an LP by AIP Records (as #AIP-10005).

Notes on the tracks
The flip side of "Every Night" by the Human Expression, "Love at Psychedelic Velocity", is better known and appeared several years earlier on the Pebbles, Volume 10 LP. The Grains of Sand (featured on the original Pebbles album), the Lyrics, and Limey & the Yanks also had tracks on Highs in the Mid-Sixties, Volume 1.  The Kim Fowley track is one of his many pseudo-documentary explorations of part of the L.A. scene.  The song by the Flower Children, which complains about miniskirts, shows that nearly every possible topic has been covered in one pop song or another.

Track listing

Side one

 Giant Sunflower: "February Sunshine" (P. Vegas/V. Geary), 2:35 — rel. 1967
 Limey and the Yanks: "Out of Sight, Out of Mind" (Duboff/Morris), 2:18 — rel. 1967
 The Search: "Climate" (Jim Mannino/Paul Mannino), 2:28
 Research 1-6-12: "I Don't Walk there No More" (R. Bozzi/M. Yess), 2:05
 The Lyrics: "Wake up to My Voice" (C. Carl), 2:44 — rel. 1967
 Kim Fowley: "The Canyon People" (Kim Fowley) — rel. 1967
 The Flower Children: "Mini-Skirt Blues" (L. Belden/S. Stoke/L. Starr), 2:05
 Somebody's Chyldren: "I'm Going Back to New York City" (David Allen), 2:00

Side two
 Hunger!: "Colors" (Mike Lane), 2:00
 The Fantastic Zoo: "Light Show" (Eric Carle), 2:20 — rel. 1967
 Time of Your Life: "Ode to a Bad Dream" (B. Renfro), 2:54
 The Human Expression: "Every Night" (The Human Expression), 2:35
 Hamilton Streetcar: "Invisible People" (P. Plummer), 3:05
 The Grains of Sand: "Golden Apples of the Sun" (M. Lloyd/The Wailers), 2:20
 The Painted Faces: "I Think I'm Going Mad" (O'Neil/Turano), 2:08
 The Love Exchange: "Swallow the Sun" (John Merrill), 2:35 — rel. 1967

Pebbles (series) albums
1983 compilation albums
Music of Los Angeles